Dimitrios Itoudis (alternate spelling: Dimitris) (born September 8, 1970) is a Greek professional basketball coach, who is the current head coach of Fenerbahçe Beko of the Turkish Basketball Super League and the EuroLeague. He also coaches the Greece men's national basketball team.

Coaching career
Itoudis began his coaching career in 1990, when he began coaching Zagreb's Under-18 team in Croatia. In 1992, he became an assistant coach with the senior men's team of Zagreb. In 1995, he became an assistant coach with the Greek Basket League club PAOK.

He then became the head coach of PAOK in 1996. He was an assistant coach with the Greek club Panionios, during the 1996–97 season, before becoming the head coach of the Greek club, Philippos Thessaloniki, from 1997 to 1999. After that, he was the head coach of the Greek club MENT.

He then became the assistant coach of Željko Obradović, with the Greek club Panathinaikos. He worked as Panathinaikos' assistant, from 1999 to 2012. While he was Panathinaikos' assistant coach, he was a part of 5 EuroLeague championship teams (2000, 2002, 2007, 2009, 2011), 11 Greek League championship teams (2000, 2001, 2003–2011), and 7 Greek Cup winning teams (2003, 2005–2009, 2012)

Itoudis became the head coach of the Turkish Super League club Banvit in 2013. In June 2014, he became the head coach of CSKA Moscow, signing a two-year deal. In his first season working with the team (2014–15), CSKA Moscow won the VTB United League, after eliminating Khimki with a 3–0 series sweep in the league's finals series. 

In his second season with CSKA Moscow (2015–16), he became the first Greek basketball coach to win the EuroLeague championship with a foreign (non-Greek) club. On June 3, 2016, he re-signed with CSKA for three seasons. In July 2016, he was named the EuroLeague Coach of the Year, for the 2015–16 season.

He left CSKA Moscow in June 2022, with one year remaining on his contract.

On 19 June 2022, he signed a 3-year-deal with Fenerbahçe.

Coaching record

EuroLeague

|-
| align="left" rowspan=7|CSKA Moscow
| align="left" |2014–15
|30||26||4|||| align="center"|Won in 3rd place game
|-! style="background:#FDE910;"
| align="left" |2015–16
|29||24||5|||| align="center"|Won EuroLeague Championship
|-!
| align="left" |2016–17
|35||26||9|||| align="center"|Won in 3rd place game
|- 
| align="left"|2017–18
| 36 || 27 || 9 ||  || align="center"|Lost in 3rd place game
|-! style="background:#FDE910;"
| align="left" |2018–19
|36||29||7|||| align="center"|Won EuroLeague Championship
|- 
| align="left"|2019–20
| 28 || 19 || 9 ||  || align="center"|Season cancelled
|- 
| align="left"|2020–21
| 39 || 27 || 12 ||  || align="center"|Lost in 3rd place game
|-!
| align="center" colspan=2|Career||233||178||55||||

Domestic Leagues

|-
| align="left" |CSKA Moscow
| align="left" |2019–20
|19||15||4|||| align="center"| Season cancelled
|-
| align="left" |CSKA Moscow
| align="left" |2020–21
|34||25||9|||| align="center"| Won 2021 VTB United League Finals 
|-
| align="left" |CSKA Moscow
| align="left" |2021–22
|31||24||7|||| align="center"|
|-class="sortbottom"
| align="center" colspan=2|Career||84|||64|||20||||

See also
 List of EuroLeague-winning head coaches

References

External links

 Dimitrios Itoudis at bdasportsinternational.com
 Dimitrios Itoudis at euroleague.net
 

1970 births
Living people
Banvit B.K. coaches
Basketbol Süper Ligi head coaches
EuroLeague-winning coaches
Greek basketball coaches
M.E.N.T. B.C. coaches
Panathinaikos B.C. non-playing staff
P.A.O.K. BC coaches
PBC CSKA Moscow coaches
Fenerbahçe basketball coaches
Philippos Thessaloniki B.C. coaches
Greece national basketball team coaches
Greek expatriate basketball people in Turkey
People from Imathia
Sportspeople from Central Macedonia